Gough Street (Chinese: 歌賦街) is a street on Sheung Wan, Hong Kong, just north of the Soho area of Central. It is connected to Shing Wong Street to the west and Aberdeen Street to the east. The street is informally referred to as "NoHo", north of Hollywood Road.

The street is named for Hugh Gough, 1st Viscount Gough, Commander-in-Chief of British Forces in China.

History 
Historically, many local printing presses and old beef-brisket noodle shops were located on Gough Street. Kau Kee Restaurant, is a notable noodle shop that specialises in beef brisket noodles in clear soup (清湯牛腩) located there. In the last several years, a lot of the printing presses moved to other areas and new restaurants and bars began to move into the premises vacated by the printing presses. Now, the street has many international fashion brands and high-end home furnishings.

See also
 List of streets and roads in Hong Kong

References

External links

 

Roads on Hong Kong Island
Sheung Wan